The Elmgrove Gardens Historic District is a residential historic district in northeastern Providence, Rhode Island, United States.  It is bounded on the north by Rochambeau Street, on the south by Woodbury Street, on the east by Cole Street, and on the west by Morris Avenue.  This area was developed most heavily between 1908 and 1948, and is a well-preserved example of an early automotive suburban residential area.  Most of the houses in the district are either 1-1/2 or 2-1/2 stories in height, and are built in an architecturally diverse variety of styles.  The district also includes to 18th-century farmhouses (at 287 and 317 Rochambeau), reminders of the area's agrarian past.

The district was listed on the National Register of Historic Places in 2005.

See also
National Register of Historic Places listings in Providence, Rhode Island

References

Historic districts in Providence County, Rhode Island
Geography of Providence, Rhode Island
National Register of Historic Places in Providence, Rhode Island
Historic districts on the National Register of Historic Places in Rhode Island